The spotted antbird (Hylophylax naevioides) is a species of bird in the family Thamnophilidae.
In southern Central America, it is found in Honduras, Nicaragua, Costa Rica and Panama; also Colombia and Ecuador of northwestern South America.
Its natural habitat is subtropical or tropical moist lowland forests.

Description

The male spotted antbird's plumage is a distinctive combination of a necklace of large black spots on a white chest, chestnut back, grey head, and black throat. The female is a duller version of the male, but also distinctive with large chest spots and two wide buffy wing-bars.

Distribution and habitat
Forages as individuals or pairs in lower levels of mature, humid forests.

Behaviour
Spotted antbirds are known to follow army ant swarms to catch insects and other small animals trying to flee. They eat spiders, scorpions, cockroaches, katydids, crickets, centipedes, sowbugs, moths, beetles, caterpillars, ants, bristletails and, on occasion, lizards and frogs.

This bird is an open-cup nesting species that lays an average clutch of 2 maroon-splotched white eggs, which both adults incubate. The nestling period is 11 days.

References

Further reading

External links

 
 

spotted antbird
Birds of Honduras
Birds of Nicaragua
Birds of Costa Rica
Birds of Panama
Birds of the Tumbes-Chocó-Magdalena
spotted antbird
Taxonomy articles created by Polbot